The Woodstock and Sycamore Traction Company was a short-lived interurban railroad that operated from 1911 to 1918 between the cities of Sycamore and Marengo, Illinois; it never reached its intended destination of Woodstock.
Its headquarters and repair shop were in the city of Genoa, midway on the route.
The  track was never electrified, due to lack of funds, so gasoline-powered cars were used. Three  McKeen cars were purchased, but the large cars proved unsatisfactory; they were replaced by two smaller Fairbanks-Morse cars.

References

External links
 Dave's Rail Pix: Illinois includes several photos of the road's equipment.

Defunct Illinois railroads
Interurban railways in Illinois
Sycamore, Illinois
Companies based in DeKalb County, Illinois
Companies based in McHenry County, Illinois
Railway companies disestablished in 1918
Railway companies established in 1911
1911 establishments in Illinois
1918 disestablishments in Illinois
American companies established in 1911